This is a list of artists currently or formerly signed under Lifeforce Records.

Artists currently signed

Burning Skies
By Night
Cipher System
Deadlock
Deadsoil
Destinity
Endstand
Fall of Serenity
Hand to Hand
Hell Within
Herod
Intronaut
Last Winter
Left to Vanish
Light Pupil Dilate
Nahemah
Nightrage
One Without
Raintime
Raunchy
Seneca
The Psyke Project
This or the Apocalypse
War from a Harlots Mouth
Withered

Artists formerly signed

All That Remains
Between the Buried and Me
Beyond the Sixth Seal
Blackout Argument
Caliban
Cassius 
Cataract
Darwin
Death Before Disco
Destiny 
End This Day
Enforsaken
Fear My Thoughts
Heaven Shall Burn
Liar
Mindfield
Sunrise
The Underwater
The Year of Our Lord
Trivium

Lists of recording artists by label